Mullane is a surname. Notable people with the surname include
Christopher Mullane (ONZM, MBE, Legion of Merit (USA)), Retired Lieutenant Colonel of the New Zealand Army
Dan Mullane, Irish celebrity chef, television personality, proprietor of The Mustard Seed in Ballingarry, County Limerick
David Mullane, 1990s rugby league footballer
Greg Mullane, Australian rugby league footballer
Jackson Mullane (born 1987), Australian film director, screenwriter and actor
John Mullane (born 1981), Irish hurler who played as a right corner-forward for the Waterford senior team
Jye Mullane (born 1981), Australian rugby league player
Mike Mullane (born 1945), retired USAF officer and a former NASA astronaut
Patrick Mullane VC (1858–1919), recipient of the Victoria Cross
Tony Mullane (1859–1944), Irish Major League Baseball player

See also
Mullane v. Central Hanover Bank
Mullaney